The Death of Speedy Ortiz is the first LP by American indie rock band Speedy Ortiz, self-released digitally in 2011 and on cassette in 2012. The LP was recorded during the summer of 2011 as a side-project while lead-singer, guitarist Sadie Dupuis was working at a camp teaching songwriting. It is described as "patchy, sardonic" "bedroom experiments" that show styles ranging from "eerily distorted folk, shambling banjo ditties" to more common associations with a sound reminiscent of underground 1990s indie rock. Dupuis wrote and performed guitar and vocals along with every instrument on the album which included “bass, drums, piano, cello, banjo, sound treatments, etc.” The album sets the precedent for later works, but is notably Lo-fi in comparison as Dupuis self-recorded the entire album.

Track listing 
All songs by Speedy Ortiz

References

Speedy Ortiz albums
2011 albums